Malta participated in the Eurovision Song Contest 2003 with the song "To Dream Again" written by Alfred Zammit and Cynthia Sammut. The song was performed by Lynn Chircop. The Maltese entry for the 2003 contest in Riga, Latvia was selected through the national final Malta Song for Europe 2003, organised by the Maltese broadcaster Public Broadcasting Services (PBS). The competition consisted of a semi-final round and a final, held on 7 and 8 February 2003, respectively, where "To Dream Again" performed by Lynn Chircop eventually emerged as the winning entry after scoring the most points from a five-member jury and a public televote.

Malta competed in the Eurovision Song Contest which took place on 24 May 2003. Performing during the show in position 5, Malta placed twenty-fifth out of the 26 participating countries, scoring 4 points.

Background 

Prior to the 2003 Contest, Malta had participated in the Eurovision Song Contest fifteen times since its first entry in 1971. Malta briefly competed in the Eurovision Song Contest in the 1970s before withdrawing for sixteen years. The country had, to this point, competed in every contest since returning in 1991. Malta's best placing in the contest thus far was second, which it achieved in 2002 with the song "7th Wonder" performed by Ira Losco.

For the 2003 Contest, the Maltese national broadcaster, Public Broadcasting Services (PBS), broadcast the event within Malta and organised the selection process for the nation's entry. PBS confirmed their intentions to participate at it on 16 September 2002. Malta selected their entry consistently through a national final procedure, a method that was continued for their 2003 participation.

Before Eurovision

Malta Song for Europe 2003 
Malta Song for Europe 2003 was the national final format developed by PBS to select the Maltese entry for the Eurovision Song Contest 2003. The competition consisted of a semi-final and final held on 7 and 8 February 2003, respectively, at the Malta Fairs & Conventions Centre in Ta' Qali. Both shows were hosted by Gianni Zammit and Mireille Bonello and broadcast on Television Malta (TVM) as well as on the website di-ve.com.

Format 
The competition consisted of twenty-four songs competing in the semi-final on 7 February 2003 where the top sixteen entries qualified to compete in the final on 8 February 2003. Five judges evaluated the songs during the shows and each judge had an equal stake in the final result. The results of the public televote had a weighting equal to the total votes of the judges. Ties in the final results were broken based on the entry which received the higher score from the judges.

Competing entries 
Artists and composers were able to submit their entries between 16 September 2002 and 15 November 2002. Both artists and songwriters were required to be Maltese or possess Maltese citizenship. Artists were able to submit as many songs as they wished, however, they could only compete with a maximum of two in the competition. 238 entries were received by the broadcaster. On 23 November 2002, PBS announced the song titles of 50 shortlisted entries that had progressed through the selection process. The twenty-four songs selected to compete in the semi-final were announced on 17 December 2002.

Among the selected songwriters, Alfred C. Sant, Jason Cassar, Paul Abela, Ray Mahoney, Sunny Aquilina, Gerard James Borg and Philip Vella were all past writers of Maltese Eurovision entries. Paul Giordimaina represented Malta in the 1991 edition with Georgina Abela, who co-wrote the Maltese entry in 2001.

Semi-final 
The semi-final took place on 7 February 2003. Twenty-four songs competed for sixteen qualifying spots in the final. The interval act of the show featured performances by the 2001 Maltese Eurovision entrant Fabrizio Faniello, the Belgian group Ian van Dahl and the local acts Ali Bubaker, Corkskrew, Kristina Casolani and Winter Moods.

Final 
The final took place on 8 February 2003. The sixteen entries that qualified from the semi-final were performed again and the 50/50 combination of votes of a five-member jury panel and the results of public televoting determined the winner. The interval act of the show featured performances by Latvia's Eurovision Song Contest 2002 winner Marie N, the 2002 Maltese Eurovision entrant Ira Losco and the 2003 Israeli Eurovision entrant Lior Narkis. After the votes from the jury panel and televote were combined, "To Dream Again" performed by Lynn Chircop was the winner.

At Eurovision
The Eurovision Song Contest 2003 took place on 24 May 2003 at the Skonto Hall in Riga, Latvia. According to Eurovision rules, all nations with the exceptions of the bottom ten countries in the 2002 contest competed. On 29 November 2002, a special allocation draw was held which determined the running order and Malta was set to perform in position 5, following the entry from Turkey and before the entry from Bosnia and Herzegovina. Malta placed twenty-fifth in the final, scoring 4 points.

The show was broadcast in Malta on TVM with commentary by John Bundy. The Maltese spokesperson, who announced the Maltese votes during the show, was Sharon Borg.

Voting 
Below is a breakdown of points awarded to Malta and awarded by Malta in the contest.

References

2003
Countries in the Eurovision Song Contest 2003
Eurovision